For the People is an American legal drama television series that aired on ABC from March 13, 2018, to May 16, 2019. On May 11, 2018, ABC renewed the series for a second season, which premiered on March 7, 2019. 

On May 9, 2019, ABC canceled the series after two seasons.

Premise
Set in the Southern District of New York (SDNY) Federal Court, known as "The Mother Court", For the People follows new lawyers—both prosecutors and federal public defenders—as they handle the most high-profile and high-stakes cases and their personal lives intersect.

Cast and characters
 Hope Davis as Jill Carlan
 Ben Shenkman as Roger Gunn
 Jasmin Savoy Brown as Allison Adams
 Susannah Flood as Kate Littlejohn
 Wesam Keesh as Jay Simmons
 Regé-Jean Page as Leonard Knox
 Ben Rappaport as Seth Oliver
 Britt Robertson as Sandra Bell
 Anna Deavere Smith as Tina Krissman
 Vondie Curtis-Hall as Judge Nicholas Byrne
 Charles Michael Davis as Ted (season 2)

Production
Britne Oldford and Lyndon Smith were cast in the pilot as Sandra Black and Allison Anderson, respectively. Both roles were later recast with Britt Robertson as Black (renamed Sandra Bell) and Jasmin Savoy Brown as Anderson (renamed Allison Adams). After re-shooting the pilot and shooting the second episode with the new actresses, production was temporarily shut down in September 2017 in order to rewrite existing scripts for the rest of the season to adjust the show to Robertson and Brown's new dynamic. Filming for the second season began on September 23, 2018.

Episodes

Season 1 (2018)
{{Episode table |background=C2B280 |overall= |season= |title= |director= |writer= |airdate= |viewers= |country=U.S. |episodes=

{{Episode list
 |EpisodeNumber   = 5
 |EpisodeNumber2  = 5
 |Title           = World's Greatest Judge
 |DirectedBy      = Andrew Bernstein
 |WrittenBy       = Zahir McGhee
 |OriginalAirDate = 
 |Viewers         = 2.67<ref name="1.05">{{cite web|url=http://tvbythenumbers.zap2it.com/daily-ratings/tuesday-final-ratings-april-10-2018/|title=Roseanne,' 'The Middle,' 'Lethal Weapon' adjust up, 'Black-ish' down: Tuesday final ratings|work=TV by the Numbers|last=Porter|first=Rick|date=April 11, 2018|access-date=April 11, 2018|archive-url=https://web.archive.org/web/20180412082800/http://tvbythenumbers.zap2it.com/daily-ratings/tuesday-final-ratings-april-10-2018/|archive-date=April 12, 2018|url-status=dead}}</ref>
 |ShortSummary    = When Nicholas receives news that a young kid, whom he once sentenced to jail for being present in a house where a raid happened and drugs were found, was beaten to death, he starts questioning the system. Sandra and Seth go up against one another in the case of Rodrigo Puente, a courier who was caught with 57 grams of meth, 7 grams over the limit for a ten-year mandatory minimum sentence. Rattled by the news he received, Nicholas refuses to impose the same sentence to Rodrigo, infuriating Roger. Allison defends a man who was caught counterfeiting wine and finds herself on the receiving end of his charms. Leonard has to make a tough call in deciding if he's going to make a case against a politician who used campaign funds to cover up an affair.
 |LineColor       = C2B280
}}

}}

Season 2 (2019)

Reception

Ratings
Overall

Season 1

Season 2

Critical response
On review aggregator Rotten Tomatoes, the series holds an approval rating of 69% based on 16 reviews, with an average rating of 7.7/10. The website's critical consensus reads, "For the People'' concept may be all too familiar, but the character depth and clever dialogue help set it apart." On Metacritic, it has a weighted average score of 60 out of 100, based on 9 critics, indicating "mixed or average reviews".

References

External links
Official website 

2010s American drama television series
2010s American legal television series
2018 American television series debuts
2019 American television series endings
American legal drama television series
American Broadcasting Company original programming
English-language television shows
Television series by ABC Studios
Television series by Shondaland
Television shows directed by Steph Green
Television shows set in New York City
Television series about prosecutors